Brigadier General Nicholas Herkimer (also known as Nikolaus Herchheimer;  – August 16, 1777) was an American military officer who fought during the Revolutionary War. He died of wounds after the Battle of Oriskany.

Early life and career
Herkimer was born in the vicinity of German Flatts in the Mohawk Valley of the Province of New York, and was the elder brother of Loyalist officer Johan Jost Herkimer. Their parents were Catherine Petri and Johann Jost Herchheimer, a son of the Palatine German immigrant Georg Herchheimer or Hirchemer from Sandhausen in the parish of Leimen south of Heidelberg. Nicholas was of slender build, with a dark complexion and black hair; he was not quite six feet tall. He could speak German, English and Mohawk.

During the attack on German Flatts in the French and Indian War, he was involved in its defense. He was made a captain in the militia on January 5, 1758, and he repelled a second attack on German Flatts in April of that year.

Herkimer built his new house in 1764 on the south shore of the Mohawk River, near the falls and the present-day city of Little Falls. He owned a number of Black slaves who worked on his estate.

Nicholas Herkimer joined the Scottish Rite Freemasonry, being initiated in the St. Patrick's Lodge, Johnstown, NY.

American Revolution
In July and August 1775 Herkimer headed the Tryon County Committee of Safety, and became colonel of the district militia. After the split in which Loyalist militia members from the area withdrew to Canada, he was commissioned a brigadier general in the Tryon County militia by the Provincial Congress on September 5, 1776. In June 1776, he led 380 men of the Tryon County militia to confront the Mohawk chief Joseph Brant at Unadilla, New York.  Herkimer asked the Mohawk and five other Iroquois nations to remain neutral, while Brant said the Indians owed their loyalty to the King.

When Herkimer learned of the siege of Fort Stanwix to the west in late July 1777, he ordered the Tryon County militia to assemble at Fort Dayton.  He marched them out to Fort Stanwix, about 28 miles to the west. His force marching in column was ambushed on August 6 by a mixed force of British regulars, Tory militia, and Mohawk in the Battle of Oriskany. Herkimer's horse was shot, and he was seriously wounded in the leg. In spite of his injuries, he sat propped up against a tree, lit his pipe, and directed his men in the battle, rallying them to avoid two panicked retreats. When they withdrew, they carried him home.

The brigade surgeon, William Petrie, dressed Herkimer's wound in the field and placed him on a litter. The wound quickly became infected, but the decision to amputate the leg was delayed for about ten days after the battle. The operation was performed by an inexperienced surgeon, Robert Johnson, because Petrie had also been wounded in the battle and was not available. The operation went poorly, the wound bled profusely, and Herkimer died of the injury on August 16, at around the age of 49.

Legacy

Herkimer's home, in what is now Little Falls, New York, is preserved as the Herkimer Home State Historic Site. Herkimer County, New York was named in his honor. His nephew, John Herkimer, later became a U.S. Congressman.

In popular culture
 Roger Imhof portrays Herkimer in the 1939 film Drums Along the Mohawk, directed by John Ford. It is based on the 1936 historical novel by Walter D. Edmonds of the same name, about the Colonial era, settlements in the valley, and the American Revolutionary War.

References
Notes

Further reading
 Foote, Allan D., "Liberty March - The Battle of Oriskany," North Country Books Inc., Utica, New York, 1998

External links

Herkimer Home State Historical Site

1728 births
1777 deaths
American people of German descent
American slave owners
British America army officers
German Palatines
Herkimer County, New York
Militia generals in the American Revolution
New York (state) militiamen in the American Revolution
People from German Flatts, New York
People from Little Falls, New York
People of New York in the French and Indian War
United States military personnel killed in the American Revolutionary War